The Club of Committed Non-Party Members (in Czech Klub angažovaných nestraníků, KAN) is a small liberal party in the Czech Republic co-founded by Rudolf Battěk.

It was founded during the Prague Spring in May 1968 by 144 leading Czechoslovak intellectuals and prominent social figures. It was formed as an independent activist organisation with the purpose of advocating a reform program. It committed itself to human rights and civil equality, political pluralism, and the principles embodied in the UN Declaration on human rights. During its peak, it claimed to have almost 15,000 members. The Soviet Army formally proscribed it in September 1968.

After the Velvet Revolution of 1989, KAN was reorganized in 1990 as a party, but it has not gained wide support in the elections and is not represented in the parliament.

See also
Liberalism
Contributions to liberal theory
Liberalism worldwide
List of liberal parties
Liberal democracy
Liberalism in the Czech lands

References

External links
Club of Committed Non-Party Members official site (in Czech)

1990 establishments in Czechoslovakia
Liberal parties in the Czech Republic
Centrist political parties in the Czech Republic
Political parties established in 1990